Mykola Koval (born  1 December 1952) is a Belorussian-born operatic baritone. He was born in Brest Region and studied solo singing in Minsk Conservatory and then in Moscow Conservatory. Since 1981, he has been a singer at the Kiev Opera and Ballet Theatre.  People's Artist of Ukraine. Since 1995, he has been a professor of Kiev University of National Culture and Art.

References
 асоціація ветеранів-підводників
 хор студентів КНУКіМ «Аніма»

20th-century Ukrainian male opera singers
1952 births
Recipients of the title of People's Artists of Ukraine
Living people